Jakub Čech (born 14 May 2000 in Prostějov) is a Czech journalist and activist.

Life
Jakub Čech wrote about local politics and city officials in his city (corruption, bossing, sexual abuse, etc.).

As of 2019, he works for Hanácký Večerník and Tiscali.cz.

Awards
 Gratias Tibi (Člověk v tísni, 2016)
 Cena za odvahu (= Prize for Courage, NFPK, 2017)

References

2000 births
Living people
Writers from Prostějov
Czech journalists